"World Shut Your Mouth" is a song by English singer-songwriter Julian Cope, released as the first single from his third album, Saint Julian (1987), on 15 September 1986. The title of the song is the same as the title of Cope's first solo album, World Shut Your Mouth, but the track does not appear on that album.

Release
"World Shut Your Mouth" was released as a single from Saint Julian in September 1986. The song is Julian Cope's biggest hit, reaching number 19 in the UK and number 84 in the US, his only single to chart there. Cope said of the success he achieved with the song, "I hated [being a pop star]. I hated the assholes. And I hated the fact ... it's what Smithy [Mark E. Smith] said himself, that all the English bands act like peasants with free milk. All their belligerence went and they turned into forelock-tugging gruelheads as soon as they were around record company types".

Ned Raggett of AllMusic described the song as a "simply fantastic hit UK single".

Accolades

Track listings 
All songs were written by Julian Cope except where noted.

UK 7-inch single (IS 290)
 "World Shut Your Mouth" – 3:34
 "Umpteenth Unnatural Blues" – 2:58

UK 12-inch single (12 IS 290)
 "World Shut Your Mouth" – 3:34
 "(I've Got) Levitation" (Hall, Sutherland) – 3:02
 "Umpteenth Unnatural Blues" – 2:58
 "Non-Alignment Pact" (Pere Ubu) – 2:48
 "Transporting" (Julian Cope Group) – 3:34

UK 12-inch remix single (12 ISX 290)
 "World Shut Your Mouth" [Remix by Trouble Funk - Long Version] – 4:35
 "(I've Got) Levitation" (Hall, Sutherland) – 3:02
 "World Shut Your Mouth" [Remix by Trouble Funk - Short Version] – 3:09

UK cassette single (C IS 290)
 Interview – 8:00
 "World Shut Your Mouth" – 3:34
 "(I've Got) Levitation" (Hall, Sutherland) – 3:02
 "Umpteenth Unnatural Blues" – 2:58
 "Non-Alignment Pact" (Pere Ubu) – 2:48

Charts

Release history

References

External links 
 

1986 songs
1986 singles
Julian Cope songs
Island Records singles
Songs written by Julian Cope